Jannie totsiens is a 1970 South African psychological horror film directed by Jans Rautenbach and starring Cobus Rossouw, Katinka Heyns, Jill Kirkland and Don Leonard. A new arrival to a mental institute is ostracised by the other patients, until they use him as a scapegoat when another patient dies. It has been viewed as representing an allegory of South African society at the time.

Main cast
 Hermien Dommisse - Magda 
 Katinka Heyns - Linda 
 Jill Kirkland - Liz 
 Patrick Mynhardt - George 
 Cobus Rossouw - Jannie Pienaar 
 Don Leonard
 Dulcie Van den Bergh

References

Bibliography
 Tomaselli, Keyan. The cinema of apartheid: race and class in South African film. Routledge, 1989.

External links

1970 films
South African horror films
1970s mystery films
Afrikaans-language films
Films directed by Jans Rautenbach